The Valley Falls Mill is a historic textile mill complex on Broad Street in Central Falls, Rhode Island.  The complex consists of the primary mill building, a large Italianate brick four-story building erected in 1849, several outbuildings. a dam across the Blackstone River, and a portion of the original canal system which provided water power to the mill.  The outbuildings include the gatehouse controlling waterflow into the canals, a small stuccoed office building now serving as a retail establishment, and a brick bathhouse built c. 1870 that stands just south of the mill race.  The complex originally had a second mill building and power canal; that building was destroyed by fire, and its canal was filled in.  The main mill building was developed as housing in the late 1970s, including a sympathetic replacement for the second mill building.

The complex was listed on the National Register of Historic Places in 1978.

See also
Valley Falls Company
National Register of Historic Places listings in Providence County, Rhode Island

References

Buildings and structures in Central Falls, Rhode Island
Industrial buildings and structures on the National Register of Historic Places in Rhode Island
National Register of Historic Places in Providence County, Rhode Island
1849 establishments in Rhode Island
Industrial buildings completed in 1849